Girls With Glasses is the debut EP by Washington, D.C-based punk band Partyline. It was released in June, 2005, by Retard Disco.

Track listing
"Unsafe At Any Speed"
"Girls With Glasses"
"Nuthaus"
"No Romantic"
"Cicada Summer"
"Girls Like Me" (Nikki & the Corvettes cover)

Personnel
Partyline
 Crystal Bradley, drums
 Angela Melkisethian, guitar
 Allison Wolfe, vocals

Production
Girls With Glasses was produced by Chad Clark, with engineering by Vice Cooler. The EP displays a classic punk rock sound, "Ramonesian in structure and delivery."

References

2005 EPs